NPY may refer to:

Neuropeptide Y, a 36 amino-acid neuropeptide that is involved in various physiological and homeostatic processes in both the central and peripheral nervous systems
NPY, the IATA airport code for Mpanda Airport, Tanzania